Llo is a commune in the Pyrénées-Orientales department in southern France.

Geography 
Llo is located in the canton of Les Pyrénées catalanes and in the arrondissement of Prades.

Population 

As of 2017, Llo's population is 172 inhabitants.

See also
Communes of the Pyrénées-Orientales department

References

Communes of Pyrénées-Orientales